Catopta tropicalis is a moth in the family Cossidae. It was described by Yakovlev and Witt in 2009. It is found in northern Vietnam.

References

Natural History Museum Lepidoptera generic names catalog

Moths described in 2009
Catoptinae